In algebra, an additive map, -linear map or additive function is a function  that preserves the addition operation:

When the domain is the real numbers, this is Cauchy's functional equation. For a specific case of this definition, see additive polynomial.

More formally, an additive map is a -module homomorphism.  Since an abelian group is a -module, it may be defined as a group homomorphism between abelian groups.

A map  that is additive in each of two arguments separately is called a bi-additive map or a -bilinear map.

Examples 

Typical examples include maps between rings, vector spaces, or modules that preserve the additive group. An additive map does not necessarily preserve any other structure of the object; for example, the product operation of a ring.

Properties 

Definition of scalar multiplication by an integer

Thus  and it can be shown that for all integers  and all   and  
This definition of scalar multiplication makes the cyclic subgroup  of  into a left -module; if  is commutative, then it also makes  into a left -module. 

Homogeneity over the integers

If  is an additive map between additive groups then  and for all   (where negation denotes the additive inverse) and

Consequently,  for all  (where by definition). 

In other words, every additive map is homogeneous over the integers. Consequently, every additive map between abelian groups is a homomorphism of -modules. 

Homomorphism of -modules

In other words, every additive map is homogeneous over the rational numbers. Consequently, every additive maps between unital -modules is a homomorphism of -modules. 

In particular, there exist additive maps that are not linear maps.

See also

Notes 

Proofs

References 

 

Ring theory
Morphisms
 
Types of functions